Dave, Davey or David O'Brien may refer to:

Sportsmen
Davey O'Brien (1917–1977), American football quarterback
Dave O'Brien (athletic director) (1956–2014), American collegiate professor at Long Beach, Temple and Northeastern
David O'Brien (racehorse trainer), Irish racehorse trainer during 1970s and 1980s
Dave O'Brien (sportscaster) (born 1963), American sportscaster
David O'Brien (sailor) (born 1965), Irish yacht racer in 2000 Summer Olympics
David O'Brien (swimmer) (born 1983), English freestyle in 2004 Summer Olympics
David O'Brien (footballer) (born 1984), Scottish left-sided midfielder
Dave O'Brien (American football), American football player

Others
Dave O'Brien (actor) (1912–1969), American film and TV performer, director and writer
David Wright O'Brien (1918–1944), American fantasy and science fiction writer
David O'Brien (actor) (1937–1989), American performer in daytime dramas
David P. O'Brien, Canadian business executive since 1980s
David O'Brien (politician) (born 1970), Australian politician from Victoria